The following table lists the adjectival and demonymic forms of cities and towns in the U.S. State of Colorado.

Table

See also

Colorado
Outline of Colorado
Index of Colorado-related articles
Bibliography of Colorado
Colorado statistical areas
Front Range Urban Corridor
North Central Colorado Urban Area
South Central Colorado Urban Area
Geography of Colorado
History of Colorado
List of counties in Colorado
List of places in Colorado
List of census-designated places in Colorado
List of forts in Colorado
List of ghost towns in Colorado
List of mountain passes in Colorado
List of mountain peaks of Colorado
List of municipalities in Colorado
List of adjectivals and demonyms for Colorado cities
List of city nicknames in Colorado
List of post offices in Colorado
Protected areas of Colorado

References

External links

Colorado state government website
Colorado tourism website
History Colorado website
The Colorado Mountain Companion

Colorado cities, List of adjectivals and demonyms for
Adjectivals and demonyms for Colorado cities, List of